The women's 1 metre springboard diving competition at the 2015 European Games in Baku took place on 19 June at the Baku Aquatics Centre.

Results
The preliminary round was started at 10:00. The final was held at 20:25.

Green denotes finalists

References

Women's 1 metre springboard